Helmut Artzinger (April 22, 1912 – October 22, 1996) was a German politician of the Christian Democratic Union (CDU) and former member of the German Bundestag.

Life 
Artzinger was a member of the CDU since 1948. In 1953 he became a council member of the city of Weinheim and in 1959 a member of the district council. He was a member of the German Bundestag from 1961 to 1976. There he first represented the constituency of Mannheim-Land and from 1965 the constituency of Bruchsal-Karlsruhe-Land II. From 1965 to 1977 he was also a member of the European Parliament.

Literature

References

1912 births
1996 deaths
Members of the Bundestag for Baden-Württemberg
Members of the Bundestag 1972–1976
Members of the Bundestag 1969–1972
Members of the Bundestag 1965–1969
Members of the Bundestag 1961–1965
Members of the Bundestag for the Christian Democratic Union of Germany